Erasmus Engert (24 February 1796, Vienna - 14 April 1871, Vienna) was an Austrian painter and art restorer. Later, he became Erasmus Ritter von Engert.

Biography 
From 1809 to 1823, Engert studied at the Academy of Fine Arts, Vienna, and later made a study trip to Italy. On his return, he set himself up as a painter of portraits, historical scenes and copies of the Old Masters. In 1843, he was named a curator at the Imperial Painting Gallery in Belvedere Palace, where he devoted himself to restoration work. 

In 1857, he became the gallery's director, and published what is now considered a very deficient catalog of the collection. 

In 1865, Kaiser Franz Joseph I awarded him the title of Ritter (Knight) and entered him into the nobility.

Sources 
 Biographical notes from the Biographisches Lexikon des Kaiserthums Oesterreich @ WikiSource

External links

1796 births
1871 deaths
Austrian painters
Austrian art curators
Austrian art directors